Zofia Wojciechowska-Grabska (April 27, 1905 – October 10, 1992) was a Polish painter. She was the daughter of President of Poland Stanisław Wojciechowski and First Lady Maria Wojciechowska.

Biography
She graduated from the Female State Junior High School J. Słowacki in Warsaw in 1924, while learning painting and drawing with Tadeusz Marczewski. In the same year, she took up studies at the Academy of Fine Arts in Warsaw under the supervision of Tadeusz Pruszkowski. She graduated in 1930 after a break related to maternity leave and her husband's illness. She stayed in touch with the Brotherhood of Saint. Łukasz.

She was a member of Association of Polish Artists and Designers (ZPAP). She practised portraits and wall painting, but the mainstream of her work was traditional religious painting. She left about 100, usually unsigned, paintings in Polish churches, including twenty in Warsaw churches. She also drew numerous charcoal portraits, including illustrations for her husband's novel Rapsodia Świdnicka (1955).

Family life

In 1927, she married the writer Władysław Jan Grabski, son of three times Polish Prime Minister Władysław Grabski. They had four children, Kazimierz (1929–1983), Maciej Władysław (1934–2016), Agnieszka (1937–2009) and Michał (1941–1986). Her son, Maciej is the father of the 2020 Civic Platform candidate for President, Małgorzata Kidawa-Błońska. She is buried next to her husband in Powązki Cemetery.

References

Bibliography 
 

article translated based on the corresponding article in the Polish Wikipedia :pl:Zofia Wojciechowska-Grabska 

20th-century Polish painters
Academy of Fine Arts in Warsaw alumni
1905 births
1992 deaths
Burials at Powązki Cemetery